Dadwar (Middle Persian: Dādwar, meaning "bearer of law") was a Sasanian administrative office which corresponded to a sort of judge, who, as a deputy of the mowbed (chief priest), evaluated civil cases at a district level. The (ham)shahr dadwar was the head of the judiciary.

References

Sources 
 
 

Positions of authority
Sasanian administrative offices
Persian words and phrases